Christian Vincent may refer to:

 Christian Vincent (director) (born 1955), French film director 
 Christian Vincent (actor) (born 1980), Canadian-American dancer, choreographer, actor and model